Obed may refer to:

Geography
Obed, Alberta, an unincorporated community in west-central Alberta, Canada
Obed, Arizona, a ghost town in northern Arizona, U.S.
Obed, Croatia, a settlement in Orle, Croatia
Little Obed River, a ten mile long stream in the Cumberland Plateau, in Cumberland County, Tennessee
Obed Lake Provincial Park, a provincial park in Alberta, Canada
Obed River, a stream draining a part of the Cumberland Plateau in Tennessee
Obed Wild and Scenic River, a stream draining a part of the Cumberland Plateau in Tennessee

People
Obed (biblical figure) (Hebrew: עובד, Oved), son of Boaz and Ruth
Obed (name)
Obed-Edom, servant of Edom's